The Radio Hall of Fame, formerly the National Radio Hall of Fame, is an American organization created by the Emerson Radio Corporation in 1988.

Three years later, Bruce DuMont, founder, president, and CEO of the Museum of Broadcast Communications, assumed control of the Hall, moved its base of operations to Chicago, and incorporated it into the MBC. It has been described as being dedicated to recognizing those who have contributed to the development of the radio medium throughout its history in the United States. The NRHOF gallery was located on the second floor of the MBC, at 360 N. State Street, from December 2011 until October 2017, when the traveling exhibit "Saturday Night Live: The Experience" was installed on the second and fourth floors. In September 2018 the MBC's board of directors was reportedly close to finalizing a deal to sell the museum's third and fourth floors to Fern Hill, a real estate development and investment firm, according to Chicago media blogger Robert Feder, which would leave the MBC with just the second floor for exhibit space. After "Saturday Night Live: The Experience" closed on March 31, 2019, the NRHOF gallery was partially restored on the second floor.

Selection process
Inductees to the Radio Hall of Fame are nominated by a 24-person Nominating Committee composed of industry programming leaders and executives, industry observers and members of academia. The Nominating Committee is inclusive of commercial and public radio.  Nominating Committee members serve two or three year terms on a volunteer basis.  The committee receives suggestions from the industry and listening public before convening and presenting a slate of 24 nominees, 16 of which are voted upon by an industry-wide Voting Participant panel while eight others are voted on by the public. The Nominating Committee subsequently chooses up to four additional individuals for induction, choosing from suggested air personalities, programmers, management or ownership.

Voting was open to the public from 2008 to 2010, then closed to public ballots from 2011 to 2014.  Public voting resumed in 2015 and continues today.

Nomination criteria
The Nominating Committee recommends nominations in the following categories:
 Longstanding Local/Regional (20 years or more);
 Active Local/Regional (10 years or more);
 Longstanding Network/Syndication (20 years or more);
 Active Network/Syndication (10 years or more);
 Music Format On-Air Personality;
 Spoken Word On-Air Personality

Controversies
The online public selection of Focus on the Family's radio program for induction in the NRHOF caused gay-rights activists to protest the induction ceremony in Chicago on November 8, 2008.

"Since 2011 the public has been shut out of the Radio Hall of Fame voting process despite requirements that the steering committee consider recommendations from the public, announce multiple nominees in four categories, and conduct public voting online. Instead, the steering committee announced each year's inductees as a fait accompli," wrote Robert Feder in June 2015 as NRHOF chairman Kraig Kitchin announced the return of public voting. In 2011, the NRHOF made headlines by inducting former U.S. president Ronald Reagan, "whose radio career spanned only five years as a sportscaster in Iowa in the 1930s," Feder reported, although Reagan also appeared on radio programs as an actor and established a practice of giving a weekly radio address which was continued by his successors.

An August 2016 article posted on the website Chicagoland Radio and Media that centered on further controversies surrounding Bruce DuMont's personal life and his presidency of the Museum of Broadcast Communications stated that he "finally succumbed to pressure" when he stepped down as the NRHOF's chairman in 2014.

Howard Stern, one of the most highly rated and visible figures in radio since the 1980s, has been vocally critical of the NRHOF. He has regularly made it a focus of his jokes, lampooning the fact that the entire nomination and selection process appeared to be controlled by Bruce DuMont, the sole authority appointing the panel for the selection process. Stern has stated he would reject any offer to join the NRHOF, and further said, "There is no Radio Hall of Fame. It's just a guy in his basement giving out awards. His name is Bruce DuMont, and he has nothing to do with radio other than the fact that his family made radios years ago." On June 28, 2012, Robert Feder reported that the "most conspicuous and embarrassing omission to the Radio Hall of Fame finally will be corrected this fall when Howard Stern is inducted."

Inductees
There are 302 members of the Radio Hall of Fame, including nine in the Class of 2021.

Individuals and Duos

 Abbott and Costello
 Goodman Ace and Jane Ace
 José Miguel Agrelot
 Raul Alarcón Sr.
 Kurt Alexander
 Fred Allen
 Mel Allen
 Don Ameche
 Eddie Anderson
 Eve Arden
 Edwin Howard Armstrong
 Jackson Armstrong
 Gene Autry
 Red Barber
 Tom Barnard
 Dick Bartley
 George G. Beasley
 Glenn Beck
 Art Bell
 Jack Benny
 Gertrude Berg
 Edgar Bergen
 Dick Biondi
 Jesse B. Blayton Sr.
 Martin Block
 Bob and Ray
 Jim Bohannon
 Bobby Bones
 Neal Boortz
 Amar Bose
 Jonathon Brandmeier
 Marty Brennaman
 Jack Brickhouse
 Brother Wease
 Himan Brown
 Joy Browne
 Jack Buck
 Gary Burbank
 Burns and Allen
 Jess Cain
 Sway Calloway
 Eddie Cantor
 Harry Caray
 Jack Carney
 Howie Carr
 Andrew Carter
 Ron Chapman
 Charlie & Harrigan
 Dick Clark
 Jerry Coleman
 Bob Collins
 Ann Compton
 William Conrad
 Jack L. Cooper
 Myron Cope
 Don Cornelius
 Charles Correll
 Norman Corwin
 Lou Costello
 Frankie Crocker
 Bing Crosby
 Powel Crosley Jr.
 Steve Dahl
 Yvonne Daniels
 Lee de Forest
 Rick Dees

 Delilah
 Dr. Demento
 Tom Donahue
 Nanci Donnellan (The Fabulous Sports Babe)
 Tommy Dorsey
 Bill Drake
 Jim Dunbar
 Don Dunphy
 Elvis Duran
 Jimmy Durante
 Richard Durham
 Bob Edwards
 Douglas Edwards
 Ralph Edwards
 Ralph Emery
 Barry Farber
 Erica Farber
 Joseph Field
 Fred Foy
 Mike Francesa
 Arlene Francis
 Stan Freberg
 Alan Freed
 John A. Gambling
 Blair Garner
 Ira Glass
 Christopher Glenn
 Arthur Godfrey
 Leonard Goldenson
 Benny Goodman
 Gale Gordon
 Freeman Gosden
 Toni Grant
 Barry Gray
 Petey Greene
 Ralph Guild
 Karl Haas
 Joan Hamburg
 Milo Hamilton
 Sean "Hollywood" Hamilton
 Bill Handel
 Sean Hannity
 John Hare
 Harry Harrison
 Lynne "Angel" Harvey
 Paul Harvey
 Paul Harvey Jr.
 Steve Harvey
 Ernie Harwell
 Terri Hemmert
 Jocko Henderson
 Gordon Hinkley
 Bob Hope
 Clark Howard
 Stanley E. Hubbard
 Cathy Hughes
 Maurice "Hot Rod" Hulbert
 Don Imus

 Dan Ingram
 Hal Jackson
 Michael Jackson
 Fred Jacobs
 E. Rodney Jones
 Jim Jordan
 Marian Driscoll Jordan
 Tom Joyner
 Harry Kalas
 H. V. Kaltenborn
 Mel Karmazin
 Carl Kasell
 Casey Kasem
 Murray "the K" Kaufman
 Garrison Keillor
 Kid Kelly
 Herb Kent
 Jim Kerr
 Larry King
 Bob Kingsley
 Kim Komando
 Kidd Kraddick
 Kay Kyser
 Art Laboe
 John Records Landecker
 John Lanigan
 Chuck Leonard
 Mark Levin
 Hal Lewis
 Rush Limbaugh
 Melvin Lindsey
 Michael “Mickey” Luckoff
 Larry Lujack
 Ron Lundy
 Joe Madison
 Ray Magliozzi
 Tom Magliozzi
 Guglielmo Marconi
 Angie Martinez
 Groucho Marx
 Luther Masingill
 Dan Mason
 Lowry Mays
 Mary Margaret McBride
 J. P. McCarthy
 Edward F. McLaughlin
 Gordon McLendon
 Graham McNamee
 Marian McPartland
 Garry Meier
 Ruth Ann Meyer
 Jon Miller
 Agnes Moorehead
 Robert W. Morgan
 "Cousin Brucie" Morrow
 Scott Muni
 Edward R. Murrow
 Manuel "Paco" Navarro
 Pat O'Day
 Eddie O'Jay
 Stu Olds
 Dick Orkin
 Charles Osgood
 Gary Owens
 Ronn Owens

 William S. Paley
 Edward Pate Jr.
 Dan Patrick
 Norman Pattiz
 Virginia Payne
 Sam Phillips
 Wally Phillips
 Dick Purtan
 James Henry Quello
 Robin Quivers
 Dave Ramsey
 Ronald Reagan
 Cokie Roberts
 Tony Roberts
 Neil Rogers
 Jim Rome
 Javier Romero
 President Franklin D. Roosevelt
 Orion Samuelson
 David Sarnoff
 Michael Savage
 Chuck Schaden
 Laura Schlessinger
 Vin Scully
 Ryan Seacrest
 Elliot Segal
 Scott Shannon
 Jean Shepherd
 Bill Siemering
 Robert Sievers
 Donnie Simpson
 Red Skelton
 Rick Sklar
 Kate Smith
 Paul W. Smith
 Eddie "Piolín" Sotelo
 Susan Stamberg
 Frank Stanton
 Alison Steele
 Bob Steele
 Don Steele
 Martha Jean Steinberg
 Charley Steiner
 Bill Stern
 Howard Stern
 Todd Storz
 Fran Striker
 Studs Terkel
 John Tesh
 Jay Thomas
 Lowell Thomas
 Rufus Thomas
 Mac Tichenor
 Les Tremayne
 Charlie Tuna
 Bob Uecker
 Ed Walker
 Orson Welles
 Ruth Westheimer
 Dick Whittinghill
 Bruce Williams
 Nat D. Williams
 Jerry Williams
 Wendy Williams
 William B. Williams
 Walter Winchell
 Wolfman Jack

Programs

 All Things Considered
 Amos 'n' Andy
 The Bob & Tom Show
 The Breakfast Club
 Can You Top This?
 Car Talk
 CBS Radio Mystery Theater
 CBS World News Roundup
 The Charlie McCarthy Show

 Don McNeill's Breakfast Club
 Easy Aces
 The Eric & Kathy Show
 Fibber McGee and Molly
 Focus on the Family
 Fresh Air
 Gang Busters
 The Goldbergs
 Grand Ole Opry
 The Great Gildersleeve
 Inner Sanctum Mystery

 Jack Armstrong
 The Jef & Jer Showgram
 Kevin & Bean
 Little Orphan Annie
 The Lone Ranger
 Lux Radio Theatre
 Ma Perkins
 The March of Time
 The Mark & Brian Show
 The Mercury Theatre on the Air
 Mike & Mike
 Music & the Spoken Word

 National Barn Dance
 One Man's Family
 Preston & Steve
 The Romance of Helen Trent
 The Shadow
 Suspense
 Take It or Leave It
 You Bet Your Life
 Your Hit Parade

See also
 NAB Broadcasting Hall of Fame
 American Museum of Radio and Electricity
 Museum of Radio and Technology

References

External links
 

History of radio
Radio
Broadcasting in the United States
Media museums in Illinois
Museums in Chicago
Awards established in 1988